Christus Health is an international Catholic, faith-based, not-for-profit health system comprising almost 350 services and facilities, including more than 60 hospitals and long-term care facilities, 175 clinics and outpatient centers and dozens of other health ministries and ventures. Its corporate headquarters are in Irving, Texas.

Christus Health services can be found in 60 cities in Texas, Arkansas, Louisiana, Georgia, and New Mexico in the U.S.; also, in the Pontificia Universidad Católica de Chile Health Network in Santiago, Chile, and Chihuahua, Coahuila, Nuevo León, Puebla, San Luis Potosí, and Tamaulipas in Mexico. The system employs approximately 30,000 people and has more than 9,500 physicians on facility medical staffs who provide care and support for patients. Christus Health is listed among the top ten Catholic health systems in the U.S., and provided more than $313.5 million in total community benefit in Fiscal Year 2011, which equates to more than $858,900 a day in community benefits.

History 
The present company was formed on January 28, 1999 by the merger of Houston's Sisters of Charity Health Care System and San Antonio's Incarnate Word Health System; however its history extends back to 1866, with the founding of St. Mary's Hospital in Galveston, Texas, by the Sisters of Charity religious institute.

Another significant merger came in 2016 when CHRISTUS merged with Trinity Mother Frances Hospitals and Clinics (itself the product of a merger of two Catholic-based systems), giving it a major presence in East Texas.

Mission 
The company's mission statement is "To extend the healing ministry of Jesus Christ".

In its marketing materials, the first word of the company's name is written as CHRISTUS in all caps, although the company explains it not as an acronym but as the Latin word for Christ.

Awards 
 Palladium Balanced Scorecard Hall of Fame for Executing Strategy (2015)

References

External links 
 CHRISTUS Health

Medical and health organizations based in Texas
Companies based in Irving, Texas
Catholic health care
Hospital networks in the United States
Catholic hospital networks in the United States